Achfary is a hamlet in the Scottish council area of Highland. To the east of the village lies Loch nan Ealachan.

It is owned by the Grosvenor Estate (the Duke of Westminster) and is renowned for its unusual black and white telephone box, erected in the 1960s. In response to a campaign by the Duke to keep the box in place, a spokesman for BT said in October 2008 that it had been "used for three chargeable calls last year and 29 in all. The other 26 were free." Despite this, it remains one of the least-known villages in Scotland.

Achfary post office opened on 1 September 1956, and is still open to this day.

The Reay Forest Estate's offices were, until recently, located in part of the house closest to the village hall; now it is housed in the top floor of the newly erected Steading Building, a two-storey office and workshed arrangement with its design based on the farmhouse previously occupying that spot. The front of the building contains a plaque that was first housed in a church, which was later closed and the plaque moved to the farmhouse. Following the demolition of the farmhouse, which, at that time, was used as a workshop of sorts, it was decided that the Steading Building should contain this plaque as well.

Achfary's village hall, commonly used for functions, also houses its school, Achfary Primary. The school, while not the smallest in the area, is among the smallest in Britain, with only eight pupils as of May 2009. Two of these were scheduled to leave in the summer, and a further three were transfers from neighbouring Scourie Primary, a school caught in an argument between various members of its community, leading to the temporary transfer of many of its pupils to other nearby primary schools.

In 1982, the English poet J. H. Prynne sent a series of four postcards from Achfary to friend and contemporary poet Ed Dorn, who published them in his newspaper Rolling Stock under the title 'Highland Notes'. In these pieces, Prynne reads the landscape of Achfary through the lens of its historical background during the Highland Clearances, writing: 'This place is sharply desolate, empty because invisibly emptied.'

Climate
On 28 December 2019, a maximum temperature of 18.7 °C was recorded by the Met Office. This is the highest temperature ever recorded in the UK during December.

References

External links

Populated places in Sutherland